Woltman is a surname. Notable people with the surname include:

Clem Woltman (1914–1988), American football player
George Woltman (born 1957), American mathematician
Henry Woltman (1889–1964), American neurologist
Woltman sign, a medical sign
Reinhard Woltman (1757–1837), German engineer

See also
Woltmann